Ólafía Þórunn Kristinsdóttir (born 15 October 1992) is an Icelandic former professional golfer. She was named the Icelandic Sportsperson of the Year in 2017. She was the first golfer from Iceland to participate in the LPGA Tour. In August 2022, she announced her retirement from professional golf.

Results in LPGA majors
Results not in chronological order before 2019.

CUT = missed the half-way cut
T = tied

Team appearances
Amateur
European Ladies' Team Championship (representing Iceland): 2009, 2010, 2011
Espirito Santo Trophy (representing Iceland): 2014

Professional
European Championships (representing Iceland): 2018 (winner – mixed team)

References

External links

Ólafía Thórunn Kristinsdóttir
Wake Forest Demon Deacons women's golfers
LPGA Tour golfers
Ladies European Tour golfers
Ólafía Thórunn Kristinsdóttir
1992 births
Living people